UFO is the third demo EP by Newton Faulkner. It was released on December 4, 2006 as a follow up to Full Fat. A studio recording of Teardrop (cover of the Massive Attack song) was later released as a single on Hand Built by Robots. The songs U.F.O and Feels Like Home are also included on this album.

Track listing
 "U.F.O"
 "Feels Like Home"
 "Alone Again"
 "Teardrop" live
 "Lullaby"

References 

2006 EPs
Newton Faulkner albums